James Roche Verling (27 February 1787 – 1858) was a British Army surgeon who became personal surgeon to Napoleon Bonaparte on St Helena.

Life
Verling was born in Queenstown (now Cobh), County Cork, Ireland on 27 February 1787.  He graduated in medicine from the University of Edinburgh. He was commissioned Second Assistant Surgeon in the Ordnance Medical Department (which provided medical officers to the Royal Artillery and Royal Engineers) in 1810 during the Peninsular War. After the defeat of Napoleon and his exile in St Helena after 1815 the British decided that Napoleon needed a personal physician. The first to fill that post was another Irishman, Barry Edward O'Meara, but he was dismissed as it was felt he was too close to Napoleon. Verling had already been a surgeon on board the ship HMS Northumberland, which brought Napoleon to St Helena, and was chosen to replace O'Meara and to Spy on Napoleon by Hudson Lowe who was general of the Island at that time. He never treated Napoleon only saw him from a distance.  He was never replaced, but Napoleon's mother Leatia brought over another doctor to treat Napoleon. 

After Napoleon's death in 1821, he helped in his autopsy, which carried out the verdict of death was stomach cancer.

Verling returned home to Cobh in 1822, where he lived at Bella Vista (which is now the Bellavista Hotel) until his death. He was promoted First Assistant Surgeon, Surgeon in 1827, and Senior Surgeon in 1843. He is buried in the Old Church Cemetery (also called Clonmel cemetery), Cobh.

References

 Napoleon and Doctor Verling on St Helena. Ed. by J. David Markham.  Barnsley, UK: Pen & Sword, 2005. 178 pages. .
 Great Island Churches. Published by Cobh Museum, The Islander Series No.1, 1998

External links
 

Irish surgeons
Alumni of the University of Edinburgh
British Army personnel of the Napoleonic Wars
Royal Army Medical Corps officers
People from Cobh
1787 births
1858 deaths